Artem Ivanov (born April 5, 1988) is a Ukrainian player in the International draughts and draughts-64. He won European  championship 2015 in rapid, many times champion of Ukraine in International draughts and draughts-64. International Grandmaster (GMI).

World Championship

International draughts
 2013 (11 place)
 2015 (4 place)
 2017 (12 place)
 2021 (7 place)

European Championship

International draughts
 2008 (18 place)
 2010 (14 place)
 2012 (12 place)
 2014 (14 place)

External links
Pfofile, FMJD
Pfofile, KNDB

References

1988 births
Living people
Ukrainian draughts players
Players of international draughts